Maiwoche (May Week) is the name of an annual festival which takes place in the German city of Osnabrück, and also in Herdecke, Germany.

Maiwoche in Osnabrück 

During the Maiwoche, artists and music groups of various genres perform on numerous stages spread out across the whole of Osnabrück’s city centre. These regularly include nationally and sometimes internationally renowned performers such as Die Happy, The Spencer Davis Group, Die Angefahrenen Schulkinder, Lotto Kind Karl, 4Lyn, Madsen, Mickie Krause and Casper; however most of the groups tend to change from year to year. Stalls are also set up between the stages - similarly to funfairs – during the Maiwoche. In addition, a swing ride is set up every year in front of the cathedral in Osnabrück.

The Osnabrücker Aktien Brauerei was a co-founder of the modern Osnabrück Maiwoche. The first Maiwoche festival was opened in May 1972 with a beer barrel tapping, in the presence of then-Lord Mayor Ernst Weber. It is the largest public festival in north Germany.

More than 600,000 people attended the Maiwoche in Osnabrück in 2007 (which took place from 11 – 20 May). In 2008 it took place from 1 – 12 May (Whit Monday) and saw an estimated 700,000 people attend. The 2009 and 2010 events took place from the 8 – 17 May and the 13 – 24 May respectively. In 2011 it took place from 13 – 22 May, in 2012 from 11 – 20 May, and in 2013 from 9 – 20 May.

Maiwoche in Herdecke 
The Maiwoche in Herdecke is also an annual public festival. Alongside typical dishes and drinks from the Harz region there are a number of offerings for tourists at the Maiwoche. Herdecke’s partner city Blankenburg is also involved in the festival.

References

External links 
 Official website of the Maiwoche in Osnabrück
 Webpage with detailed event programme, photos from the festival and community functions

Tourist attractions in Osnabrück
Music festivals established in 1972
Music festivals in Germany
Tourist attractions in Lower Saxony